Bäxtiär Qanqayıv (pronounced , , Bakhtiyar Kankayev) was a colonel in Yemelyan Pugachev's rebel army, joined the rebellion in December 1773.  He agitated people to join the rebellion in Kungur, Ufa and Kazan uyezds, and united Tatar rebels to own unit.  Participated in the battle of Kazan.  In 1774 his unit was defeated by governmental forces near Balıq Bistäse. His subsequent fate is unknown.

Bäxtiär Qanqayıv in art 
Tufan Miñnullin wrote a historical play "Bäxtiär Qanqay uğlı" in 1974. There is an audio recording in the archives of Tatarstan radio from 1978.

References

Tatar people from the Russian Empire
Military personnel of the Russian Empire